The ancient Greek word aithôn means "burning", "blazing" or "shining." Less strictly, it can denote the colour red-brown, or "tawny." It is an epithet sometimes applied to animals such as horses at Hom. Il. 2.839 ; oxen at Od.18.372; and an eagle at Il. 15.690 (cf. Hyginus' calling the eagle that tormented Prometheus an aethonem aquilam at Fabulae 31.5.). The eagle who tormented Prometheus, Aethon, was the child of the monsters Typhon and Echidna. In English, aithôn may be written Aethon, Aithon or Ethon. In Greek and Roman mythology there are a number of characters known as Aethon. Most are horses, variously belonging to:

 Helios
 Ares
 Hector
 Pallas
 Hades (Claudian)

The name is twice applied to humans. In Odyssey 19.183, it is the pseudonym a disguised Odysseus assumes during his interview with Penelope upon his return to Ithaca. According to fr. 43a.5 of Hesiod's Catalogue of Women, Erysichthon of Thessaly was also known as Aethon due to the "burning" hunger (aithôn limos) he was made to endure by Demeter.

See also

 Chrysoritis aethon, a species of butterfly

Notes

References 

 Callimachus, Hymns translated by Alexander William Mair (1875-1928). London: William Heinemann; New York: G.P. Putnam's Sons. 1921. Online version at the Topos Text Project.
 Callimachus, Works. A.W. Mair. London: William Heinemann; New York: G.P. Putnam's Sons. 1921. Greek text available at the Perseus Digital Library.
 Homer, The Iliad with an English Translation by A.T. Murray, Ph.D. in two volumes. Cambridge, MA., Harvard University Press; London, William Heinemann, Ltd. 1924. Online version at the Perseus Digital Library.
 Homer, Homeri Opera in five volumes. Oxford, Oxford University Press. 1920. Greek text available at the Perseus Digital Library.
 Publius Ovidius Naso, Metamorphoses translated by Brookes More (1859-1942). Boston, Cornhill Publishing Co. 1922. Online version at the Perseus Digital Library.
 Publius Ovidius Naso, Metamorphoses. Hugo Magnus. Gotha (Germany). Friedr. Andr. Perthes. 1892. Latin text available at the Perseus Digital Library.
 Publius Vergilius Maro, Aeneid. Theodore C. Williams. trans. Boston. Houghton Mifflin Co. 1910. Online version at the Perseus Digital Library.
 Publius Vergilius Maro, Bucolics, Aeneid, and Georgics. J. B. Greenough. Boston. Ginn & Co. 1900. Latin text available at the Perseus Digital Library.
 Quintus Smyrnaeus, The Fall of Troy translated by Way. A. S. Loeb Classical Library Volume 19. London: William Heinemann, 1913. Online version at theio.com
 Quintus Smyrnaeus, The Fall of Troy. Arthur S. Way. London: William Heinemann; New York: G.P. Putnam's Sons. 1913. Greek text available at the Perseus Digital Library.

Personifications in Greek mythology
Greek gods
Characters in Roman mythology
Horses in mythology
Legendary birds
Deeds of Demeter